Glass harp may refer to:

Glass harp, a musical instrument
Glass Harp (band), a progressive rock band
Glass Harp (album), an album by a band of the same name

Disambiguation pages